Mieszuki  is a village in the administrative district of Gmina Wyszki, within Bielsk County, Podlaskie Voivodeship, in north-eastern Poland.

According to the 1921 census, the village was inhabited by 134 people, among whom 125 were Roman Catholic, 1 Orthodox, and 8 Mosaic. At the same time, 125 inhabitants declared Polish nationality, 1 Belarusian and 8 Jewish. There were 23 residential buildings in the village.

References

Mieszuki